The 1900–01 season was the second season for FC Barcelona.

Events
On 23 September, Barcelona won its first-ever piece of silverware (a bronze object) after beating their biggest rival, Català FC, 3 to 1 courtesy of goals from Joan Gamper (2) and Otto Maier. This was also the first match of the 1900–01 season and the last game played at the Velódromo de la Bonanova.

On 18 November, Barcelona played its first match on a field next to the Hotel Casanovas, the club's second football pitch after Bonanova. They played against Hispania AC and ended in a 0–0 draw.

On 23 December, Barça played their first match against Societat Espanyola de Futbol (Society Spanish Football), which would later become RCD Espanyol. The match ended without goals in an atmosphere of brotherhood.

On 20 January, Barcelona played their first-ever match in an official competition, the opening match of the 1900–01 Copa Macaya against Hispania AC at Hotel Casanovas, but despite scoring first thanks to George Girvan, a Scottish player formerly of Escocès FC, it was Hispania who won 2–1 after coming back with two goals from their captain, Gustavo Green.

On 27 January, Barcelona got their first-ever victory in an official competition after beating Societat Espanyola 4 to 1. Joan Gamper scored all 4 goals.

On 17 March, Barcelona achieved the biggest victory in the club's history with an 18–0 win over AUF Tarragona. Joan Gamper scored half of them, and Alexander Black scored a hat-trick.

On 25 April, Bartomeu Terrades succeeded Walter Wild as president of the club.

Squad

Matches 

1 First Barcelona-Espanyol in history. The blue-and-white team was called at the beginning Societat Espanyola de Futbol (Society Spanish Football).
2 Both teams choose not to provide information, or results, or any other party data.
3 The second-round match against Espanyol was not disputed due to its withdrawal from the competition.

External links
 Official Site

References

FC Barcelona seasons
Barcelona